Joan Rivers: A Piece of Work is a 2010 documentary film about the life and career of comedian Joan Rivers, also featuring Melissa Rivers, Don Rickles and Kathy Griffin.

It had its world premiere at the Sundance Film Festival on January 25, 2010. It was released on June 11, 2010, by IFC Films. The film received positive reviews from critics.

Synopsis
 
The film follows Joan Rivers for 14 months, mostly during the 76th year of her life. The film made an effort to "[peel] away the mask" and expose the "struggles, sacrifices and joy of living life as a ground breaking female performer." The New York Times reported that Stern and Sundberg "lucked out" with their timing, starting to film the year before Rivers won Donald Trump's Celebrity Apprentice in 2008.

Cast
All appearing as themselves
 Joan Rivers
 Melissa Rivers
 Kathy Griffin
 Don Rickles

Release
The film had its world premiere at the Sundance Film Festival on January 25, 2010. Shortly after, IFC Films acquired distribution rights to the film. It also screened at the Tribeca Film Festival on April 26, 2010, and the San Francisco International Film Festival at the Castro Theatre on May 6, 2010. It was released in a limited release on June 11, 2010.

Box office
In its opening weekend, the film made $164,351 while playing at 7 theaters.

Home media
On December 14, 2010, A Piece of Work was released on Region 1 DVD and Blu-ray, complete with the theatrical trailer, 10 deleted scenes, and TV spots.

Critical reception
Joan Rivers: A Piece of Work received positive reviews from film critics. It holds a 92% approval rating on review aggregator website Rotten Tomatoes, based on 108 reviews, with a weighted average of 7.65/10. The site's critical consensus reads, "Penetrating Rivers' coarse image, this compelling documentary offers an honest, behind-the-scenes look at her career -- and at show business in general." On Metacritic, the film holds a rating of 79 out of 100, based on 34 critics, indicating "generally favorable reviews".

Awards
U.S. Documentary Editing Award - Sundance Film Festival (2010)

References

External links
 
 
 
 
 Ebert, Roger (16 June 2010). "Joan Rivers: A Piece of Work". Chicago Sun Times

2010 films
2010 documentary films
American documentary films
Films set in California
Films set in New York City
Films shot in California
Films shot in New York City
Joan Rivers
IFC Films films
Documentary films about comedy and comedians
Films directed by Ricki Stern and Anne Sundberg
2010s English-language films
2010s American films